The Asociación de Guías de Cuba (Girl Guides of Cuba) was started by María Abrisqueta de Zulueta, a Spanish citizen settled on the island, also founder of the Girl Guide Movement in Spain, and two Cuban sisters surnamed Brull.

The association is a former member of the World Association of Girl Guides and Girl Scouts, last mentioned in 1969. Law-Decree 2118 of 27 January 1955 declared the Asociación de Guías de Cuba of public utility, and therefore approved national scale organization throughout the Republic.

See also

Asociación de Scouts de Cuba

References

External links 
 Notas Hitóricas del Gudismo en España (1929-2009)

Disbanded Scouting organizations
Youth organizations based in Cuba
Scouting and Guiding in Cuba
Youth organizations established in 1940
1940 establishments in Cuba